Irene Selina Dean-Williams (12 July 1903 – 3 July 1946) was a pioneer aviator. She was the first woman to obtain a commercial pilot license and became the first woman pilot to own an aircraft in Western Australia. She is best known for making a record-breaking flight from Perth to Sydney.

Early life

Dean-Williams was born Selina Irene Schmidt and adopted her stepfather’s surname in 1910.

Career

Dean-Williams obtained her private pilot’s licence on 30 May 1931. She then obtained a commercial pilot’s licence in late 1932. Her mother bought her a bi-plane and the renowned Harry “Cannon-Ball” Baker gave her flight instruction.

In 1932 she made a record-breaking flight. She was the first woman to fly between Perth and Sydney return. Sponsored by Berlei Clothing Company, Dean-Williams left Perth on 27 March 1932 arriving in Sydney on 20 April 1932. Her return flight left Sydney eight days later. Flying at 80 miles per hour she returned to Perth on 27 April 1932.

Dean-Williams died of cancer on 3 July 1946.

Legacy

A building is named after Dean-Williams at Perth Airport.

A collection of her papers was donated to the J.S.Battye Library of West Australian History in 2008.

References

1903 births
1946 deaths
Women aviation record holders
Australian women aviators
Australian aviation record holders